Ruth Braden McNamee (June 7, 1921 – November 19, 2006) was an American politician.

Born in New York City, New York, McManee received her bachelor's degree in English and political science in 1942 from Bucknell University. She served on the Birmingham, Michigan city commission from 1965 to 1974 and was mayor of Birminghman, Michigan in 1970 and 1971. She also served on the Oakland County, Michigan Board of Commissioners in 1968 and was a Republican. From 1975 to 1984, McNamee served in the Michigan House of Representatives.

McNamee died at the Indian River Medical Center, in Vero Beach, Florida.

References

1921 births
2006 deaths
Politicians from New York City
People from Birmingham, Michigan
Bucknell University alumni
Women state legislators in Michigan
County commissioners in Michigan
Michigan city council members
Mayors of places in Michigan
Republican Party members of the Michigan House of Representatives
Women city councillors in Michigan
Women mayors of places in Michigan
20th-century American politicians
20th-century American women politicians
21st-century American women